Ko Ko Hlaing (born 24 October 1956 in Myinmu) is a Burmese military researcher and writer, served under Thein Sein as the chief political advisor to the President's Office of Myanmar, after being appointed on 19 April 2011.

In 1976, he graduated from the Defence Services Academy. The following year, he joined the Myanmar Army, as a gazetted officer. From 1991 to 2004, he served as the War Office's First Class Chief Researcher. In 2004, he was promoted to the rank of Advisor of the Ministry of Information's Press Scrutiny and Registration Division, the country's chief censorship agency.

References

Defence Services Academy alumni
Burmese military personnel
1956 births
People from Sagaing Region
Burmese writers
Living people
Foreign ministers of Myanmar
Specially Designated Nationals and Blocked Persons List
Individuals related to Myanmar sanctions